Beach chair means "chair on the beach" and can refer to:
 Deckchair, a portable folding chair used at deck or on the beach.
 Strandkorb, a special hooded windbreak seating furniture used at vacation and seaside resorts.